Hari Mata Hari is a Bosnian pop band. Hari Mata Hari is the stage name for the singer Hari Varešanović. The group originated from the city of Sarajevo, the capital of Bosnia and Herzegovina. The group has performed over 1,000 concerts and sold 5 million albums to date. Their songs are among the most famous and popular love ballads in the former Yugoslavia era. Hari Mata Hari was the representative of Bosnia and Herzegovina at the Eurovision Song Contest 2006 held in Athens, Greece. Coincidentally, hari mata hari is Malay for 'day of the sun, or Sunday'.

History
The band, Hari Mata Hari, has constantly changed its members. Today, the group is composed of Hari Varešanović (vocal), Izudin Izo Kolečić (drums), Lordan Muzaferija (bass guitar), Dzenan Selmanagic (electric guitar), and Adis Vuga (keyboards). Most of the Hari Mata Hari's songs are arranged by Hajrudin Varešanović. The lyrics are primarily written by Fahrudin Pecikoza - also known as Peco.

Hari grew up in the Vratnik neighborhood of Sarajevo's old town. His grandfather was one of the more well-known singers of traditional Bosnian music called sevdalinka. At the age of six, Hajrudin began to sing and learned to play the guitar. At the local cultural center, he was asked to sing, then at the age of ten he sang with the group "Omi", and later for the group "Sedam šuma". In Vratnik, Hari recorded his first song "Zašto da ne uzmem nju". (Why don't I take her) After finishing electrical school, Varešanović began to study Philosophy and attended classes of natural politics, but he never completed the courses. Music took up much of his time, as did his love of photography.

In 1979, Hari joined the group Zov with whom he recorded the hit song "Poletjela golubica sa Baščaršije." Next, Varešanović sang with the group "Ambasadori", with whom, it is said, that he matured into a professional artist. After serving his mandatory military service in the town of Niš, he appeared on the music scene by himself releasing the (1984) album Zlatne Kočije. In September 1985, Hari Varešanović together with the group members of Baobab - Izo Kolečić, Edo Mulahalilović, Pjer Žalica, and Zoran Kesić - won the festival Nove nade, nove snage (New hopes, new strengths) organised by Želimir Altarac Čičak, and created the musical group Hari Mata Hari. That same year, the new group announced the release of their new album U tvojoj kosi. (In your hair) In 1986, Pjer Žalica - "Badžo" and Zoran Kesić left the group. They were replaced by pianist Adi Mulihalilović and bass player Neno Jeleč, who will eventually be replaced by Željko Zuber. Their album of 1986, Ne bi te odbranila ni cijela Jugoslavija, (Not even all of Yugoslavia could defend you) was voted as the best album of the year, and Jugovision, the national competition for Eurovision, announced them as the candidate for Yugoslavia. Hari Mata Hari, in 1986, received fifth place for the song "U tvojoj kosi (In your hair)," and fourteenth place for the song "Nebeska kraljica" in 1987 in Belgrade.

1988 brought much prosperity to the group. Hari began to record for the recording company Jugoton, based in Zagreb. The album "Ja te volim najviše na svijetu" (I love you the most in the world) from 1988 sold over 300,000 copies, and carried 10 songs that are still popular (2006) - ("Igrale se delije", "Javi se", "Sedamnaest ti je godina" (You're 17) with Tatjana Matejaš-Tajči, "Naše malo misto", "Ja te volim najviše na svijetu" (I love you the most in the world), "Hej, kako si" (Hey, how are you?), "Zapleši" (Dance), "Kad dođe oktobar" (When October comes), "Ruža bez trna", "Poslednji valcer sa Dunava").

This prosperity was followed by another album called Volio bih da te ne volim (I wish I didn't love you), which sold over 500,000 copies - ("Svi moji drumovi", "Na more dođite" (Come to the sea), "Što je bilo bilo je", "Pazi šta radiš" (Careful what you do) with Matejaš-Tajči). Then in 1990, Hari Mata Hari releases another album called Strah me da te volim (I'm afraid to love you). This album sold over 700,000 copies - ("Prsten i zlatni lanac" (Ring and a golden necklace), "Otkud ti k'o sudbina", "Ostavi suze za kraj", "Daj još jednom da čujem ti glas", "Nek' nebo nam sudi").

The collapse of Yugoslavia and the wars that ensued, left a mark in Hari Mata Hari's career. In 1991, Edo Mulahalilović left the group to start his own career. In late 1991, the group releases the album Rođena si samo za mene (You were born only for me) through the recording company Diskoton, located in Sarajevo. Some of the songs from the album are: "Ja ne pijem with" with Haris Džinović, "Nije za te bekrija", "Nije zima što je zima", that had solid sales and success. With that album, most activity stopped, due to the war in Bosnia and Herzegovina. In late 1994, the group released another album, while they were refugees in Germany. The album was called Ostaj mi zbogom ljubavi - "Bilo je lijepo dok je trajalo" (It was beautiful while it lasted), "Ti si mi droga" (You're my drug), "Ja sam kriv što sam živ", and cover version of song "Poletjela golubica" (The dove flew) with Halid Bešlić. This album was made only by Hari and Izo, the rest of the group would not reunite until 1997-1998. The group was composed of (besides Hari and Izo) Karlo Martinović, Miki Bodlović, Adi Mulihalilović, and Emir Mehić. They returned to the music scene with a greatest hits album called Ja nemam snage da te ne volim (I don't have the strength to not love you). It was released in 1998 - ("Ne lomi me", "Emina", "Ja nemam snage da te ne volim" (I don't have the strength to not love you), "Gdje li si sada ljubavi" (Where are you now love?), "Upomoć"). The song "Ja nemam snage da te ne volim" sounds like the Sisters Of Mercy's song "This Corrosion".

In 1999, Varešanović was chosen to represent Bosnia and Herzegovina for Eurovision. However, he was disqualified due to an issue with the song's status. Hari sold the song "Starac i more" (The old man and the sea) to Finland in 1997 and Finnish artist Janne Hurme recorded that song in Finnish, named "Sydänveri" (Finnish for "Heart Blood"). Dino Merlin, who was the runner up, was sent to Eurovision instead and received seventh place. Hari, together with Hanka Paldum, recorded the duet "Crni snijeg" (Black snow) in 2001. That same year (2001) the album Baš ti lijepo stoje suze came out with a few hit songs - ("Kao domine" (Like dominoes), "Zjenico oka moga", "Baš ti lijepo stoje suze"). In 2002 with the song "Ruzmarin" (Rosemary), that became an instant hit. Hari Mata Hari was one of the six finalists in the Croatian Radio Festival and represented Bosnia and Herzegovina for the OGAE in France. Also, in 2002 Hari Mata Hari won the first Davorin song of the year award, for the song "Kao Domine" (Like dominoes). The music for the song was written by Miki Bodlović and Hari Varešanović, with lyrics by Fahrudin Pecikoza. Then in 2003 Hari's song "Idi", brought him to the seventh Croatian Radio Festival with the song "Navodno" with Ivana Banfić. He then went to the Splitski festival. After Hari's small concerts on the Balkans, in Europe, and in Australia, the group began to record a new album. Franjo Valentić, Hari's long time friend joins the group, while Miki Bodlović leaves the group to start his own career in U.S. and he was replaced by Nihad Voloder. At the eighth Hrvatski radiski festival the group competed with the song "Nema čega nema". At the Splitski festival the group entered the competition with the song "Zakon jačega" (Law of the strong) recorded with Bosnian superstar singer Kemal Monteno. Later that year the group released another album under the name of the song "Zakon jačega", for Sarajevo's Diskoton, Zagreb's Croatia Records, and Belgrade's HI-FI Centar.

In 2007 the group released the single: "Zar je to još od nas ostalo".

In 2009 the group released the album Sreća (Luck) and this album came out with a few hit songs: "Azra", "Sreća", "Ne mogu ti reći što je tuga" with Nina Badrić, "Tvoje je samo to što daš" with Eldin Husenbegović.

Nihat Voloder left the group and he was replaced by Željko Zuber.

In 1999, the group played for seven days in Belgrade at the "Sava center".

Eurovision 2006
PBSBiH, through a public on-line voting system, chose Hari Mata Hari as the Bosnian representative for Eurovision. BH Eurosong gave the name "Vrijeme je za Bosnu i Hercegovinu" (It's time for Bosnia and Herzegovina), and the song was described as Bosnia's Romeo and Juliet. The first time the song was aired to the public was on March 5, 2006 on a special live evening celebration held by "BH Eurosong 06" in the Sarajevo National Theatre. Hari sang the song for the first time in public and received a standing ovation. Six days later, Hari sang the song at his first stage appearance in Belgrade on the final evening of Evropesma 2006. The song "Lejla" (Composer: Željko Joksimović, Lyric writers: Fahrudin Pecikoza & Dejan Ivanovic) is a powerful love ballad about far away love. It uses styles of sevdah and local traditional instruments. The female name Lejla is a traditional Arab name. Eric Clapton and ZZ Top both used the name Leyla in their songs. It is said the title refers to a popular Bosnian song from 1981, when a song called "Lejla" was the Yugoslavian entry to the Eurovision Song Contest. It was sung by Bosnian artist Seid Memić Vajta and reached 15th place in Dublin.

The lyrics of the song were written by Fahrudin Pecikoza and Dejan Ivanović with the music by Željko Joksimović. Joksimović, represented Serbia and Montenegro at the Eurovision Song Contest 2004 in Istanbul ("Lane moje", second place), the song was written for non-profit and was solely voluntary. The music video of "Lejla" was directed by Pjer Žalica, along with Hari and the band. It shows many old Bosnian traditions. It was recorded in several areas of Herzegovina: on the mountains of Blidinja and on the national park/lake Hutovo Blato, on Ruištu, and in the city of Mostar. The video ends with the Stari Most, the older part of the city, in the background. The song received its name through on-line voting (with 3501 votes, other name ideas were "Zar bi mogla ti drugog voljeti?" (Could you not love another?) with 660, and "Sakrivena" with 462 votes). Hari Mata Hari took 3rd place at Eurovision Song Contest 2006 with 229 points.

Group Members

Current members
Hari Varešanović - vocal
Adis Vuga - keyboards
Dzenan Selmanagic - guitar
Lordan Muzaferija - bass guitar
Izudin - Izo Kolečić - drums

Cooperation 
Dino Merlin
Jelena Tomašević
Elena Risteska
Haris Džinović
Hanka Paldum
Sanja Ilić
Igor Cukrov
Zdravko Čolić
Dragana Mirković
Nina Badrić
Ivana Banfić
Tajči
Crvena jabuka
Kemal Monteno

Festivals
2002 – Croatian Radio Festival 2002
2003 – Croatian Radio Festival 2003
2003 – Split 2003
2004 – Croatian Radio Festival 2004
2009 – Croatian Radio Festival 2009 /Grand Prix Winner/

Discography
1984 – Zlatne kočije - Hari Varešanović's solo album
1985 – Skini haljinu
1985 – U tvojoj kosi
1986 – Ne bi te odbranila ni cijela Jugoslavija
1988 – Ja te volim najviše na svijetu
1989 – Volio bi' da te ne volim
1990 – Strah me da te volim
1991 – Rođena si samo za mene
1994 – Ostaj mi zbogom ljubavi
1998 – Ja nemam snage da te ne volim
2001 – Baš ti lijepo stoje suze
2002 – Ružmarin
2004 – Zakon jačega
2009 – Sreća
2016 – Ćilim

References

External links

Hari Mata Hari performing Lejla at the Eurovision Song Contest 2006

Bosnia and Herzegovina musical groups
Eurovision Song Contest entrants for Bosnia and Herzegovina
Eurovision Song Contest entrants of 2006
Yugoslav musical groups
Musical groups established in 1985
1985 establishments in Yugoslavia